PubPeer is a website that allows users to discuss and review scientific research after publication, i.e. post-publication peer review.

The site has served as a whistleblowing platform, in that it highlighted shortcomings in several high-profile papers, in some cases leading to retractions and to accusations of scientific fraud,
as noted by Retraction Watch. Contrary to most platforms, it allows anonymous post-publication commenting, a controversial feature which is the main factor for its success. Consequently, accusations of libel have been levelled at some of PubPeer's users; correspondingly the website now requires commentators to use only facts that can be publicly verified.

See also
 Journal club
 JournalReview.org
 Publons

References

Further reading

External links 
 PubPeer Selections on Retraction Watch

Academic publishing
Peer review
Scientific method
Criticism of academia
Internet properties established in 2012
Open science